Thaís Helena da Silva (born 19 June 1987) is a Brazilian professional footballer who plays as a goalkeeper who plays for Série A2 club Ceará SC. She has been called up to the Brazil women's national team.

Early life
Thaís Helena was born in Itu, São Paulo.

International career
Thaís Helena played for Brazil at the 2004 FIFA U-19 Women's World Championship in Thailand.

References

External links

1987 births
Living people
People from Itu, São Paulo
Footballers from São Paulo (state)
Brazilian women's footballers
Women's association football goalkeepers
Esporte Clube XV de Novembro (Piracicaba) players
São José Esporte Clube (women) players
Associação Ferroviária de Esportes (women) players
ASA Tel Aviv University players
Associação Esportiva Tiradentes players
Grêmio Foot-Ball Porto Alegrense players
São Paulo FC (women) players
Ceará Sporting Club players
Division 1 Féminine players
Ligat Nashim players
Campeonato Brasileiro de Futebol Feminino Série A1 players
2007 FIFA Women's World Cup players
Brazilian expatriate women's footballers
Brazilian expatriate sportspeople in France
Expatriate women's footballers in France
Brazilian expatriate sportspeople in Israel
Expatriate women's footballers in Israel